Saint Frances Academy is an independent Catholic high school in Baltimore, Maryland. Founded in 1828, it is the first and oldest continually operating Black Catholic educational facility in the United States.

History

Background 
In the early 1800s, various Protestant organizations in Baltimore such as Sharp Street Methodist Episcopal Church’s Free African School (1802), Daniel Coker’s Bethel Charity School (c. 1812), St. James Protestant Episcopal Day School (1824), and William Lively’s Union Seminary (1825) created schools for African-American students. While providing a valuable service, they could not meet the demands of Baltimore’s growing free African-American population. (There were no free public schools for children of color in Baltimore until 1866.) Mother Mary Lange recognized the need for education for African American children and opened a school for them in her home in the Fells Point area of the city.

Early years 
On June 13, 1828, the Oblate School for Colored Girls opened for its first year at 5 St. Mary's Court in Baltimore's Seton Hill neighborhood, northwest of downtown, near St. Mary's Seminary and College, then located on North Paca Street, the first Catholic seminary in America, founded 1791. It was established with the mission to teach "children of color to read the Bible" —which, since it included teaching slaves, was then illegal.

The following year in 1829, the school taught out of 610 George Street and then 48 Richmond Street (now West Read Street), a few blocks away. The school graduated its first class with ceremonies in 1832. 

By 1853, the school changed its name from the Oblate School for Colored Girls to the Saint Frances School for Colored Girls, named after St. Frances of Rome (1384–1440), and later shortened and elevated to the Saint Frances Academy.

In 1871, the school moved to its current location in inner East Baltimore at 501 East Chase Street in what is now the Johnston Square neighborhood.

Modern era 
The high school began admitting boys in the 1970s. The school now offers a traditional, co-educational, college-preparatory curriculum for students in grades nine through twelve. 

An honors program is available to select students and all students complete a community service component. Independently owned and operated by the Oblates, the school is approved by the Maryland State Department of Education and is accredited by the Commission on Secondary Schools of the regional agency of the Middle States Association of Colleges and Schools. 

The student population is still predominantly African-American.

Bill and Camille Cosby donations 
In 2012, Camille Cosby, an alumna of a school in Washington run by the Oblates, and her husband Bill Cosby made a donation to assist St. Frances Academy in building a community center in East Baltimore. The community center was originally named after her and her husband, but his name was removed after the revelation of multiple sexual offenses.

Athletics

Football 
St. Frances' football program has become the subject of controversy within Maryland in the late 2010s. After former Gilman School coach Biff Poggi took over as head coach, he began aggressively recruiting talented players from inside and outside Maryland, to a greater degree than other private schools in the state did. Within a few seasons, St. Frances became effectively unbeatable by their traditional opponents in the Maryland Interscholastic Athletic Association (MIAA), regularly defeating them by wide margins.

Before 2018 those teams told St. Frances they would no longer play them, citing safety concerns as many of St. Frances' recruits were well outside the typical height and weight range for high school players and more in line with college football teams. Some St. Frances supporters believe the opponents' real motives are racial since there had been no complaints when predominantly white teams like Gilman had been similarly successful in earlier seasons. The team won the MIAA championship before the season even started since all those opponents had to forfeit their games, but scheduled intrasquad scrimmages, opponents from as far away as Canada, and road trips to the South for the players' benefit.

Poggi departed the program in July 2021 but the team continued its winning ways, finishing the following season in the top 5 of MaxPreps' 10 national rankings.

Basketball 

 Men's Basketball (MIAA A Conference Championships): 2008–09, 2009–10, 2012–13, 2015–16, 2018–19. 
 Women's Basketball (IAAM A Conference Championships): 2000–01, 2001–02, 2002–03, 2003–04, 2004–05, 2005–06, 2006–07, 2007–08, 2009–10, 2015–16, 2016–17, 2017–18, 2018–19, 2019-20

Notable alumni 

 
 Jaelyn Duncan (c/o 2017), American football player
 Darnell Harris (c/o 2004), basketball player
 Billie Holiday (1920), jazz singer and songwriter
 Mark Karcher (c/o 1997), basketball player
 Angel McCoughtry (c/o 2004), Olympian basketball player
Sean Mosley (c/o 2008), basketball player
 Sandra Williams Ortega, PhD (c/o 1953), U.S. Air Force Officer
 Devin Gray (c/o 1991), basketball player

See also

Mother Mary Lange, Foundress of Saint Frances Academy

National Catholic Educational Association
Oblate Sisters of Providence

Notes and references

External links
 St. Frances Academy School Website
 Roman Catholic Archdiocese of Baltimore

Catholic secondary schools in Maryland
Private schools in Baltimore
Educational institutions established in 1828
1828 establishments in Maryland
African-American Roman Catholicism 
African-American Roman Catholic schools
Oblate Sisters of Providence